"Let's Go Brandon" is a political slogan and Internet meme used as a substitute for the phrase "Fuck Joe Biden" in reference to Joe Biden, the 46th and current president of the United States.

Chants of "Fuck Joe Biden" began during sporting events in early September 2021. On October 2, 2021, during a televised interview with the Sparks 300 race winner Brandon Brown at Talladega Superspeedway in Talladega, Alabama, NBC Sports reporter Kelli Stavast incorrectly described the chant in the background as "Let's Go Brandon", which sparked the meme. The slogan has become well known through use by Republican politicians and critics of Biden. The phrase quickly spread to popular culture, with rap songs using the phrase placing high on record charts.

Origins

Background: Anti-Biden chants 
In early September 2021, chants of "Fuck Joe Biden" were reported to have broken out in several college football games in the Southern United States. Later that month, the phenomenon spread to other universities, including Wyoming. Similar anti-Biden chants took place during the September 2021 Ryder Cup.

The Washington Examiner reported that "Fuck Joe Biden" was chanted by some attendees at a Megadeth concert in September 2021, and at an October 2021 protest in response to a vaccine mandate for educators in New York City.

Initial use of the phrase in an interview with Brandon Brown 

On October 2, 2021, racing driver Brandon Brown was being interviewed by NBC Sports reporter Kelli Stavast at the Talladega Superspeedway in Alabama, following his victory in the NASCAR Xfinity Series Sparks 300 race which was shortened due to darkness. Fans were chanting "Fuck Joe Biden", and this became audible to viewers of the broadcast. On the live broadcast, while wearing a headset, reporter Stavast stated, "You can hear the chants from the crowd, 'Let's go, Brandon! It is unclear whether Stavast misunderstood the chant or whether she intentionally misquoted it; a reporter with the Associated Press said that the chant was "at first difficult to make out".

Early spread and reactions 
Footage of the interview went viral, leading to the adoption of the phrase by critics of President Biden as an expression of antipathy toward him. It has also been reported as a protest against perceived liberal bias in mainstream media, based on speculation that the reporter's description of the crowd's chant was intended to conceal anti-Biden sentiment.

Conservative commentators Ben Shapiro and Tomi Lahren spread the phrase via Twitter. The slogan has been printed on clothing, a billboard, and a banner flown behind a plane over a pro-Donald Trump rally in Iowa.

According to The Independent, on October 19, "The anti-Biden war cry 'Let's Go Brandon' is no longer a conservative media phenomenon, it's infiltrating mainstream popular culture and is now number one and two on iTunes, knocking Adele's new single into third place."

As the phrase began to increase in use, Brandon Brown found the phrase amusing and tweeted: "To all the other Brandons out there, You're welcome! Let's go us". In private, he was ambivalent about the phrase because it overshadowed his Talladega win and threatened to scare off corporate sponsors leery of controversy. He planned to ignore the phrase, but later worried that his silence was perceived as a tacit endorsement of the sentiment. In October 2021, Brown's Brandonbilt Motorsports team was struggling to acquire sponsorship, as companies were hesitant to support him due to his indirect association with the chant and its political undertones. In December 2021, Brown, who is a Republican, said he had remained quiet during its proliferation because he had "zero desire to be involved in politics," before expressing his wish for it to be used in a positive context instead. Brown took a more mixed stance in an op-ed for Newsweek, in which he said he was "not going to endorse anyone" or be silent about issues important to him.

On November 5, 2021, NASCAR president Steve Phelps denounced any implied association with the slogan, saying that the organization does not want to be associated with politics on either the left or the right.

Usage

Analysis 
Linguist John McWhorter analyzed the linguistic attributes of the chant in The Atlantic, likening the use of "Brandon" to a hlonipha  a substitution of a forbidden word. He wrote that the anti-Biden euphemism has a similar tone to the word SNAFU, which stands for "Situation Normal – All Fucked Up", or to the word "cuckservatives" (a portmanteau of "cuckold" and "conservatives") which is used by some nationalists or paleoconservatives to describe neoconservatives perceived as being in fact liberals. McWhorter described the Let's Go Brandon phenomenon as "simply fascinating", and a "wild, woolly kink in the intersection of language, politics, wit, and creativity."

On November 20, 2021, the editorial board of the Pittsburgh Post-Gazette said that the chant "reveals a moral bankruptcy of those who chant it even in church". In a November 23, 2021, opinion piece for The Washington Post, Marc Thiessen, a former chief speechwriter for president George W. Bush, commented that the chant was tame compared to what has been said about other presidents. Initially, Thiessen was not a fan of the chant, but concluded his comments with, "it is a perfectly harmless and humorous way for Americans to express their frustration at a flailing – and failing – presidency."

Politics 

Republican politicians have used the phrase publicly. On October 21, Republican congressman Bill Posey concluded remarks on the House floor with "Let's go, Brandon". Texas Governor Greg Abbott used the phrase in an October 22 tweet. He attributed the popularity of the phrase to frustration with Biden's "disastrous policies", including his handling of the COVID-19 pandemic and the southern border. The following week, Republican representative Jeff Duncan wore a face mask with the phrase imprinted on it on the House floor. Senator Ted Cruz posed with a "Let's Go Brandon" sign that was hung in Houston at the 2021 World Series. Later in 2021, a rapidly increasing number of national Republican politicians explicitly supported or referred to the phrase.

On November 12, 2021, when asked about Biden's views regarding the phrase, White House Press Secretary Jen Psaki responded, "I don't think he spends much time focused on it or thinking about it."

While President Biden and First Lady Jill Biden were taking phone calls for NORAD's Santa tracker hotline on December 24, 2021, a caller ended his chat by saying, "Merry Christmas and let's go Brandon," to which President Biden smiled and responded, "Let's go Brandon, I agree."

At the 2022 White House Correspondents' Dinner, Biden acknowledged the phrase by joking, "Republicans seem to support one fella, some guy named Brandon. He's having a good year, I'm kind of happy for him."

In April 2022, Colorado state representative Dave Williams ran for the House of Representatives and attempted to be listed on the ballot under the name "Dave 'Let’s Go Brandon' Williams". Colorado Secretary of State Jena Griswold denied Williams' request under the reasoning that "Let's go Brandon" is a slogan and not a nickname. Williams sued, with former Colorado Secretary of State Scott Gessler acting as his attorney. Although Denver District Judge Andrew McCallin agreed with Williams that he had successfully proved that he used "Let's go Brandon" as his nickname, the judge ultimately ruled that Secretary of State Griswold acted within her authority in denying Williams the use of the nickname on the ballot. Williams attempted to appeal the verdict to the Colorado Supreme Court, but the court refused to hear his appeal.

Music 
Soon after the chant went viral, an anti-Biden rap song called "Let's Go Brandon" was recorded by Loza Alexander. The song first went viral on TikTok before rising to number one on the iTunes Store Top Hip-Hop/Rap Songs list, and number two on the platform's Top Songs list, on October 18, 2021. Alexander's song reached number 38 on the Billboard Hot 100 for the week of November 6, 2021.

Another song with the same title was released by Bryson Gray, a conservative Christian rapper, reaching number one on iTunes. It debuted at number 28 on the US Hot 100. The music video for Gray's song, which included the line "Biden said the jab stop the spread, it was lies" (in reference to COVID-19 vaccination efforts by Biden) was taken down by YouTube for containing "medical misinformation". A country rap song of the same name was recorded by Forgiato Blow. On October 27, iTunes had different "Let's Go Brandon" recordings at numbers one, two, four and eight.

On January 25, 2022, Kid Rock released a single, "We the People", in which he attacks the media, Dr. Anthony Fauci, masks, COVID-19 restrictions, and Big Tech, and which features the chant "Let's go Brandon" in the chorus.

Brandon Brown sponsorship 
In early November, the right-wing crypto coin LGBcoin (LGB) began trading, and on December 30, 2021, LGBcoin announced that it would be sponsoring Brandon Brown's Brandonbilt Motorsports for the 2022 NASCAR Xfinity Series season. Brandonbilt's spokesman told Fox Business that approval was received on December 26, but on January 5, 2022, FOX Sports journalist Bob Pockrass reported that NASCAR had not approved the sponsorship. In response, investor James Koutoulas threatened a lawsuit against NASCAR, and called for a boycott until the decision was reversed.

In February 2022, the U.S. 11th Circuit Court of Appeals ruled in a lawsuit against Bitconnect that the Securities Act of 1933 extends to targeted solicitation using social media. In April 2022, a class-action lawsuit was filed in Florida by plaintiff Eric De Ford against the LGBcoin cryptocurrency company and its promoters Brandon Brown, NASCAR, and political commentator Candace Owens. The plaintiff alleges they made false or misleading statements about the LGBcoin in a pump and dump scheme.

Other 
After the president fell off his bike in Rehoboth Beach, Delaware in June 2022, a Google Maps user listed the spot as a historical landmark on Google maps named Brandon Falls. However,  "Brandon Falls" is not an official landmark named by the state of Delaware. Google reverted the landmark shortly after that. 

In 2022, a then-nine-year-old autistic boy named Brandon Brundidge saw a sign with the phrase and, not knowing the political meaning, assumed that they were supporting him. It inspired him to try swimming and biking without training wheels. His mother wrote a book called Brandon Spots his Sign, and they later met Brandon Brown.

The phrase has been used on bumper stickers supporting Brandon Presley, a Democratic candidate for Governor of Mississippi in 2023.

Dark Brandon 

In mid-2022, the phrase was repurposed as "Dark Brandon", a comically menacing version of Biden used in memes by supporters of his presidency. "Dark Brandon" also referenced "Dark MAGA", a conspiracy theory started by U.S. Representative Madison Cawthorn surrounding a potential return of former President Trump to power. Several White House officials, members of the Biden team, as well as U.S. Senator Chris Murphy, made posts referencing "Dark Brandon" on social media. The term is often used when Biden "goes on the offensive". An Agence France-Presse journalist wrote that the variant rebranded "him from ineffectual grandfather figure to a kind of political terminator." An August piece in Rolling Stone criticized it for distracting from Biden's policy accomplishments and appropriating "fashwave" imagery.

Gallery

See also
O1G, a similar slogan used in opposition to Hungarian Prime Minister Viktor Orbán
"FDT", a protest song by American rappers YG and Nipsey Hussle, whose title is an initialism for "Fuck Donald Trump"
Thanks, Obama, a slogan which gained popular use through viral memes protesting the presidency of Barack Obama
"Maggie Out": an anti-Margaret Thatcher chant used during Thatcher's time as prime minister of the United Kingdom
 Mondegreen
 Minced oath
"Putin khuylo!", a slogan used in opposition to Russian President Vladimir Putin, which became popular in Ukraine after the annexation of Crimea

References 

2021 neologisms
2021 in American television
2021 controversies in the United States
2021 in NASCAR
2021 in sports in Alabama
American political catchphrases
Articles containing video clips
Biden administration controversies
Chants
Conservatism in the United States
Cultural depictions of Joe Biden
Euphemisms
Internet memes introduced in 2021
Mass media issues
NASCAR controversies
NASCAR on television
NASCAR terminology
NBCSN
October 2021 events in the United States
Political Internet memes
Politics and sports
Presidency of Joe Biden
Sports controversies
Television controversies in the United States